Calum Elliot (born 30 March 1987) is a Scottish former professional footballer and is the current manager of Penicuik Athletic, who played as a forward for Heart of Midlothian, Motherwell, Livingston, Dundee, Žalgiris Vilnius, Alloa and Raith Rovers. He also represented Scotland at youth international levels up to and including the under-21 team. He was manager of Tranent Juniors until he left his position in August 2022.

Club career

Hearts
Elliot grew up in south-western Edinburgh, attending Bonaly Primary School then Firrhill High School. He signed for Hearts in 2004, having previously played with their youth initiative and Salvesen Boys Club. He made his first team debut as a substitute against Inverness Caledonian Thistle early in the 2004–05 season. He scored his first Hearts goals in the 5–0 win over Falkirk in December 2005. Less than a week later he signed a new three-and-a-half-year deal with the Jambos. His form during the 2005–06 season ensured he was considered a possible candidate for the 2006 Scottish PFA Young Player of the Year, although the title was won by Kilmarnock's Steven Naismith. Elliot was surprised to find himself available for loan at the beginning of the 2006–07 season, although his initial anger and disappointment were replaced by an acceptance of the benefit of regular first team action. Despite interest from Dunfermline Athletic and Falkirk, Elliot eventually joined Motherwell on loan. In May 2008, Elliot was linked with a move to Scottish First Division side Dunfermline Athletic. Inverness Caley Thistle were also reported to be looking at the unsettled striker in June 2008. Elliot travelled south for talks with League 1 side MK Dons, but eventually signed for Livingston on a loan deal, where he scored 11 goals in thirteen appearances. Elliot started in his first match for Hearts since returning on loan from Livingston on 4 April 2009 against Kilmarnock, scoring twice in a 3–1 win. Thanks to this display, Elliot won the SPL Young Player of the Month for April 2009.

Due to injury appearances were limited and he failed to score any goals during the 2009–10 season. The following season Elliot scored three goals in the first two games of the 2010–11 season with his fourth goal coming against Inverness Caley Thistle in a 3–1 victory for Hearts. Due to an ongoing knee injury his appearances were limited and had to undergo surgery which ruled him out of the end of the season. Having built his fitness back up on 4 November 2011, he signed for Scottish First Division side Dundee on a month's loan. Making his debut the following day against Partick Thistle Only 30 seconds into the match he suffered a recurrence of his knee injury and despite trying to play on had to be stretchered off after four minutes. The injury was not as bad as first feared and he missed only one game before returning as a substitute in Dundee's 2–1 win over Stirling. His loan was later extended until 31 December. With Hearts in financial difficulty and looking to cut their squad, on 12 December 2011 it was announced the Elliot had come to an agreement with Hearts to end his contract with the club early. His contract expired on 1 January 2012.

Žalgiris Vilnius and Alloa Athletic
Having turned down an offer to join Houston Dynamo on a weeks trial, Elliot agreed a two-year deal with Lithuanian A Lyga club Žalgiris Vilnius. He signed for them on 20 January 2012. Elliot scored his first goal for Žalgiris Vilnius on his first A Lyga game in a 2–1 away win over FK Banga Gargždai. He then scored 4 goals in his second league match against FK Atlantas in a 7–0 demolition at home. On 20 May 2012, he won the Lithuanian Football Federation Cup with Žalgiris Vilnius defeating the winner of the tournament in the previous two seasons Ekranas 3–1 after a penalty shootout.

On 25 February 2013, it was announced by Scottish Second Division club Alloa Athletic that Elliot had signed a deal which would see him play the club until the end of the season. He was due to be included in Paul Hartley's squad for the midweek trip to Arbroath the same week, subject to international clearance from the Lithuanian FA.

Raith Rovers
In April 2013, Eliott signed a pre-contract agreement to rejoin Livingston for the 2013–14 season, having previously spent time on loan with the club earlier in his career. On 4 June, fellow Scottish First Division side Raith Rovers announced he had signed for them on a one-year deal, prompting the West Lothian side to seek urgent clarification. Both clubs felt they were entitled to register the player however, on 6 June, Livingston decided not to pursue the situation further citing their disappointment in the player's conduct. This left Raith Rovers free to register the player. After two years with Raith, Elliot was forced to retire in 2015 due to knee injuries.

International career
Elliot was rewarded with a place in the Scotland squad for the 2006 UEFA U-19 Championships. He scored twice during the tournament, including the winner in the 1–0 semi-final victory over the Czech Republic, as Scotland creditably finished runners-up. In the summer of 2007, Elliot was selected in the squad Scotland squad for the FIFA Under-20 World Cup, which was held in Canada.

Management
Elliot was appointed manager of Junior side Edinburgh United in August 2015. He resigned 14 months later, with the club lying in sixth place in the Junior South Division and 16 points off promotion.

Elliot joined Mousehole in November 2017. The club play in the South West Peninsula League which is competed for by teams in Devon and Cornwall. Elliot's initial roles were as player, in combination with being full-time academy coach and also assisting first-team manager Kevin Richards. Elliot then took on the role of manager on a temporary basis following Richards' departure from the club in April 2018, with the position now since made permanent.

On 26 November 2018, Elliot become the new manager of Tynecastle.

Elliot was announced as the new manager of Tranent Juniors on 26 September 2020 until August 2022.

Elliot was appointed as the new manager of Penicuik Athletic on 6 March 2023.

Managerial

Personal life
While Elliot was playing for Hearts, Hibernian defender Darren McCormack was arrested for an alleged assault on Elliot on 22 March 2009 near an Edinburgh nightclub.

Career statistics

Honours

As a player
Žalgiris Vilnius
Lithuanian Football Cup: 2011–12

Raith Rovers
Scottish Challenge Cup: 2013–14

Individual
SPL Young Player of the Month: December 2005, April 2009
SFL Young Player of the Month: September 2008

As a manager
Tynecastle
East of Scotland Conference B: 2019–20 

Tranent Juniors
East of Scotland Premier: 2021–22 (Promoted to Lowland League after play-off)

References

External links

 
 Appearances at londonhearts.com

1987 births
Living people
People educated at Firrhill High School
Footballers from Edinburgh
Scottish footballers
Association football forwards
Heart of Midlothian F.C. players
Livingston F.C. players
Motherwell F.C. players
Dundee F.C. players
Raith Rovers F.C. players
FK Žalgiris players
Scotland under-21 international footballers
Scottish Premier League players
Scottish Football League players
Lothian Thistle Hutchison Vale F.C. players
Scottish Professional Football League players
Scottish football managers
Edinburgh United F.C. managers
Mousehole A.F.C. managers
Tynecastle F.C. managers
Tranent Juniors F.C. managers
Mousehole A.F.C. players
Lowland Football League managers
Penicuik Athletic F.C. managers